Why Me? is a 1978 animated short film by Janet Perlman and co-directed by Derek Lamb.

Summary
Nebbish average guy Nesbit Spoon's (Marshall Efron) various reactions (denial, anger, grief) to death after he is told by his doctor (Richard Gilbert) 
 that he only his five minutes to live.

See also
Life after death
Horoscope
Cryogenics

References

External links
Why Me? on National Film Board of Canada website

Why Me? on YouTube

1978 films
1978 animated films
1970s animated short films
National Film Board of Canada animated short films
Films directed by Janet Perlman
Films about death
1970s Canadian films